As a nickname, Hammer or the Hammer may refer to:

Pre-modern era
 Judas Maccabeus (died 160 BC), Jewish rebel leader
 Charles Martel (686–741), Frankish ruler

Modern era
 Hank Aaron (born 1934), American baseball player
 Jörg Albertz (born 1971), German footballer
 Gabe Carimi (born 1988), All-American football player
 Mark Coleman (born 1964), American mixed-martial artist, collegiate, Olympic and professional wrestler
 Tom DeLay (born 1947), 23rd Majority Leader of the United States House of Representatives
 Armen Gilliam (1964–2011), American basketball player
 Matt Hamill (born 1976) American mixed-martial artist, collegiate wrestler
 Alexander Hammerstone (born 1991), American professional wrestler
 Joel Hanrahan (born 1981), American baseball player
 Richard H. Helmholz (born 1940), American law professor
 Thomas Hitzlsperger (born 1982), German footballer, "Der Hammer"
 Vyacheslav Molotov (1890–1986), Soviet politician and diplomat
 Dave Schultz (ice hockey), (born 1949) Canadian hockey player
 Jim Shapiro (attorney), American personal injury lawyer
 Greg Valentine (born 1950), American professional wrestler
 Fred Williamson (born 1938), American football player and actor
 Josh Willingham (born 1979), American baseball player

See also 

Lists of people by nickname